In Islam, Qirāah, (pl. Qirāāt) are different linguistic, lexical, phonetic, morphological and syntactical forms permitted with reciting the holy book of Islam, the Quran. Differences between Qiraat are slight and include varying rules regarding the prolongation, intonation, and pronunciation of words, but also differences in stops, vowels, consonants (leading to different pronouns and verb forms), and less frequently entire words. Qiraʼat also refers to the branch of Islamic studies that deals with these modes of recitation.

There are ten different recognised schools of qiraat, each one deriving its name from a noted Quran reciter or "reader" (qāriʾ pl. qāriʾūn or qurr'aʿ), such as Nafi‘ al-Madani, Ibn Kathir al-Makki, Abu Amr of Basra, Ibn Amir ad-Dimashqi, Aasim ibn Abi al-Najud, Hamzah az-Zaiyyat, Al-Kisa'i.
While these readers lived in the second and third century of Islam, the scholar who approved the first seven qira'at (Abu Bakr Ibn Mujāhid) lived a century later, and the readings themselves have a chain of transmission (like hadith) going back to the time of Muhammad. Consequently,  the readers/qurr'aʿ who give their name to Qira'at are part of a chain of transmission called a riwaya. The lines of transmission passed down from a riwaya are called turuq, and those passed down from a turuq are called wujuh.

Qiraat should not be confused with Tajwid—the rules of pronunciation, intonation, and caesuras of the Quran. Each Qira'ah has its own Tajwid. Qiraat are called readings or recitations because the Quran was originally spread and passed down orally, and though there was a written text, it did not include most vowels or distinguish between many consonants, allowing for much variation. (Qiraat now each have their own text in modern Arabic script.) 
Qira'at are also sometimes confused with Ahruf—both being variants of the Quran with "unbroken chain(s) of transmission going back to the Prophet". There are multiple views on the nature of the ahruf and how they relate to the qira'at, a common one being that caliph Uthman eliminated all but one variety of ahruf sometime in the mid-7th century CE. The seven readings, or Qira'at, were selected later and canonized in the 9-10th century CE.

Even after centuries of Islamic scholarship, the variants of the Qira'at have been said to continue "to astound and puzzle" Islamic scholars (by Ammar Khatib and Nazir Khan), and along with Ahruf make up "the most difficult topics" in Quranic studies (according to Abu Ammaar Yasir Qadhi). Qira'at may also seem to conflict with the doctrine that the Quran "exists exactly as it had been revealed to the Prophet; not a word - nay, not a dot of it - has been changed", which many Muslims assume means there must be only one reading of the Quran. The Qira'at include differences in consonantal diacritics (i‘jām), vowel marks (ḥarakāt), and the consonantal skeleton (rasm), resulting in materially different readings (see examples).

The maṣḥaf Quran that is in "general use" throughout almost all the Muslim world today is a 1924 Egyptian edition based on the Qira'at "reading  of Ḥafṣ on the authority of `Asim" (Ḥafṣ being the Rawi, or  "transmitter", and  `Asim being the Qari or "reader").

History
According to Islamic belief, the Qur'an is recorded in the preserved tablet in heaven (al-lawh al-mahfooz), and was revealed to the prophet Muhammad by the angel Gabriel.

Quranic orthography

Early manuscripts of the Qur’ān did not use diacritics either for vowels (Ḥarakāt) or to distinguish the different values of the rasm (I‘jām) [see the graphic to the right], -- or at least used them "only sporadically and insufficiently to create a completely unambiguous text".

Gradual steps were taken to improve the orthography of the Quran, in the first century with  dots to distinguish similarly-shaped consonants (predecessors to i‘jām), followed by marks (to indicate different vowels, like ḥarakāt) and nunation in different-coloured ink from the text (Abu'l Aswad ad-Du'alî (d. 69 AH/688 CE). (Not related to the colours used in the graphic to the right.) Later the different colours were replaced with marks used in written Arabic today.

Adam Bursi has cautioned that details of reports that diacritics were added at the direction of al-Hajjaj under Caliph Abd al-Malik ibn Marwan are a "relatively late development" and that "While ʿAbd al-Malik and/or al-Ḥajjāj do appear to have played a role in the evolution of the qurʾānic text, the initial introduction of diacritics into the text was not part of this process and it is unclear what development in the usage of  diacritics took place at their instigation." Manuscripts already used consonantal pointing sparingly, but at this time contain "no evidence of the imposition of the kind of fully dotted scriptio plena that the historical sources suggest was al-Ḥajjāj’s intended goal", although "There  is  some  manuscript evidence  for the introduction of vowel markers into the Qurʾān in this period."

Recitations
In the meantime, before the variations were finally committed entirely to writing, the Quran was preserved by recitation from one generation to the next. Doing the reciting were prominent reciters of a style of narration who had memorized the Quran (known as hafiz).  According to Csaba Okváth,

It was during the period of  the Successors [i.e. the generation of Muslims succeeding the companions of Muhammad ] and shortly thereafter that exceptional reciters became renowned as teachers of Qur'anic recitation in cities like Makkah, Madina, Kufa, Basra, and greater Syria (al-Sham). They attracted students from all over the expanding Muslim state and their modes of recitations were then attached to their names. It is therefore commonly said that [for example] he recites according to the reading of Ibn Kathir or Nafi'; this, however, does not mean that these reciters [Ibn Kathir or Nafi] are the originators of these recitations, their names have been attached to the mode of recitation simply because their rendition of the Prophetic manner of recitation was acclaimed for authenticity and accuracy and their names became synonymous with these Qur'anic recitations. In fact, their own recitation goes back to the Prophetic mode of recitation through an unbroken chain.

Each reciter had variations in their tajwid rules and occasional words in their recitation of the Qur'an are different or of a different morphology (form of the word) with the same root. Scholars differ on why there are different recitations (see below).
Aisha Abdurrahman Bewley gives an example of a line of transmission of recitation "you are likely to find ... in the back of a Qur'an" from the Warsh harf, going backwards from Warsh all the way to Allah himself: "'the riwaya of Imam Warsh from Nafi' al-Madini from Abu Ja'far Yazid ibn al-Qa'qa' from 'Abdullah ibn 'Abbas from Ubayy ibn Ka'b from the Messenger of Allah, may Allah bless him and grant him peace, from Jibril, peace be upon him, from the Creator.'"

After Muhammad's death there were  many  qira'at, from which 25 were described by Abu 'Ubayd al-Qasim ibn Sallam two centuries after Muhammad's death.  The seven qira'at  readings which are currently notable were selected in the fourth century by Abu Bakr Ibn Mujahid (died 324 AH, 936 CE) from prominent reciters of his time, three from Kufa and one each from Mecca, Medina, and Basra and Damascus. Later, three more recitations were canonized for ten. (The first seven readers named for a qiraa recitation died un/readers of the recitations lived in the second and third century of Islam. (Their death dates span from  118 AH to 229 AH).

Each reciter recited to two narrators whose narrations are known as riwaya (transmissions) and named after its primary narrator (rawi, singular of riwaya).   
Each rawi  has turuq (transmission lines) with more variants created by  notable students of the master who recited them and named after the student of the master. Passed down from  Turuq are  wujuh: the wajh of so-and-so from the tariq of so-and-so. There are about twenty riwayat and eighty turuq.

In the 1730s, Quran translator George Sale noted  seven principal editions of the Quran, "two of which were published and used at Medina, a third at Mecca, a fourth at Cufa, a fifth at Basra, a sixth in Syria, and a seventh called the common edition " He states that "the chief disagreement between their several editions of the Koran, consists in the division and number of the verses."

Reciting
Some of the prominent reciters and scholars in Islamic history who worked with Qiraʼat as an  Ilm al-Din" (Islamic science) are:

Abu Ubaid al-Qasim bin Salam (774 - 838 CE) was the first to develop a recorded science for tajwid (a set of rules for the correct pronunciation of the letters with all their qualities and applying the various traditional methods of recitation), giving the rules of tajwid names and putting it into writing in his book called al-Qiraat. He wrote about 25 reciters, including the 7 mutawatir reciters. He made the recitation, transmitted through reciters of every generation, a science with defined rules, terms, and enunciation.

Abu Bakr Ibn Mujāhid (859 - 936 CE) wrote a book called Kitab al-Sab’ fil-qirā’āt. He is the first to limit the number of reciters to the seven known. Some scholars, such as Ibn al-Jazari, took this list of seven from Ibn Mujahid and added three other reciters (Abu Ja’far from Madinah, Ya’qub from Basrah, and Khalaf from Kufa) to form the canonical list of ten.

Imam Al-Shatibi (1320 - 1388 CE) wrote a poem outlining the two most famous ways passed down from each of seven strong imams, known as ash-Shatibiyyah. In it, he documented the rules of recitation of Naafi’, Ibn Katheer, Abu ‘Amr, Ibn ‘Aamir, ‘Aasim, al-Kisaa’i, and Hamzah. It is 1173 lines long and a major reference for the seven qira’aat.

Ibn al-Jazari (1350 - 1429 CE) wrote two large poems about Qira'at and tajwid. One was Durrat Al-Maa'nia, in the readings of three major reciters, added to the seven in the Shatibiyyah, making it ten. The other is Tayyibat An-Nashr, which is 1014 lines on the ten major reciters in great detail, of which he also wrote a commentary.

The readings

Criteria for canonical status
All accepted qira'at (according to imam Ibn al-Jazari) follow three basic rules:
 Conformity to the consonantal skeleton of the Uthmānic codex.
 Consistency with Arabic grammar.
 Authentic chain of transmission.

The qira'at that do not meet these conditions are called shaadhdh (anomalous/irregular/odd). The other recitations reported from companions that differ from the Uthmānic codex may represent an abrogated or abandoned ḥarf, or a recitation containing word alterations for commentary or for facilitation for a learner. It is not permissible to recite the shaadhdh narrations in prayer, but they can be studied academically. The most well documented companion reading was that of Abdullah ibn Masud. Dr. Ramon Harvey notes that Ibn Mas'ud's reading continued in use and was even taught as the dominant reading in Kufa for at least a century after his death and has shown that some of his distinctive readings continued to play a role in Hanafi fiqh. In 1937, Arthur Jeffery produced a compilation of variants attested in Islamic literature for a number of companion readings. More recently, Dr. Abd al-Latif al-Khatib made a much more comprehensive compilation of qira'at variants called Mu'jam al-Qira'at. This work is widely cited by academic scholars and includes ten large volumes listing variants attested in Islamic literature for the canonical readings and their transmissions, the companions, and other non-canonical reciters, mainly of the first two centuries. The process by which certain readings became canonical and others regarded as shaadhdh has been extensively studied by Dr. Shady Nasser.

The seven canonical qira'at

According to Aisha Abdurrahman Bewley and  Quran eLearning, "the seven qira’at of ibn Mujahid" are mutawatir ("a transmission which has independent chains of authorities so wide as to rule out the possibility of any error and on which there is consensus").

"The Three after the Seven" 

Bewley notes a further three Qiraat, (sometimes known as "the three after the seven"), that provide additional variants.   These three—named after Abu Jafar, Ya'qub and Khalaf—were added to the canonical seven centuries later by ibn al-Jazari (d.1429 CE) though they were popular since the time of the seven. They are  Mashhur (literally “famous”, “well-known”. "these are slightly less wide in their transmission, but still so wide as to make error highly unlikely").

The three Mashhur Qiraat added to the seven are:

Other modes of recitation
In addition to the ten "recognized" or "canonical modes" There are four other modes of recitation – Ibn Muhaysin, al-Yazeedi, al-Hasan and al-A‘mash— according to Muslim scholars, these last four recitations are considered "irregular/odd" (shaadhdh) -- Because they have invalided one or more of the three requirements for an authentic qiraat  —and so are not recognized and not considered canonical.

Hafs ‘an ‘Asim

One qira'a that has reached overwhelming popularity is the Hafs ‘an ‘Asim (i.e., the mode of ʿĀṣim ibn Abī al-Najūd (d. 127 AH) according to his student Ḥafs ibn Sulaymān (d. 180 AH)), specifically the standard Egyptian edition of the Qur’an first published on 10 July 1924 in Cairo.  Its publication has been called a "terrific success", and the edition has been described as one "now widely seen as the official text of the Qur’an", so popular among both Sunni and Shi'a that the common belief among less well-informed Muslims is "that the Qur’an has a single, unambiguous reading", namely the 1924 Cairo version. (A belief held, or at least suggested, even such scholars as the  famous revivalist Abul A'la Maududi -- "not even the most sceptical person has any reason to doubt that the Qur’än as we know it today is identical with the Qur’än which Muhammad (peace be on him) set before the world"—and the Orientalist A.J. Arberry -- "the Koran as printed in the twentieth century is identical with the Koran as authorized by ‘Uthmän more than 1300 years ago"—both of whom make no mention of Qira'at and use the singular form in describing the Quran.)
Another source states that "for all practical purposes", it is the one Quranic version in "general use" in the Muslim world today.

Among the reasons given for the overwhelming popularity of Hafs an Asim is that it is easy to recite and that Allah has chosen it to be widespread (Qatari Ministry of Awqaf and Islamic Affairs). Ingrid Mattson credits mass-produced printing press mushaf with increasing the availability of the written Quran, but also with making one version widespread (not specifically Hafs 'an 'Asim) at the expense of diversity of qira'at.

Gabriel Said Reynolds emphasizes that the goal of the Egyptian government in publishing the edition was not to delegitimize the other qira’at, but to eliminate variations found in Qur’anic texts used in state schools, and to do this they chose to preserve one of the fourteen qira’at “readings”, namely that of Hafs (d. 180/796) ‘an ‘Asim (d. 127/745).

Variations among readings

Examples of differences between readings
Most of the differences between the various readings involve consonant/diacritical marks (I‘jām) and marks (Ḥarakāt) indicating other vocalizations -- short vowels, nunization, glottal stops, long consonants. Differences in the rasm or "skeleton" of the writing are more scarce, since canonical readings were required to comply with at least one of the regional Uthmanic copies (which had a small number of differences).

According to one study (by Christopher Melchert) based on a sample of the ten qira'at/readings, the most common variants (ignoring certain extremely common pronunciation issues) are non-dialectal vowel differences (31%), dialectal vowel differences (24%), and consonantal dotting differences (16%). (Other academic works in English have become available that list and categorise the variants in the main seven canonical readings. Two notable and open access works are those of Nasser and Abu Fayyad.)

The first set of examples below compares the most widespread reading today of Hafs from Asim with that of Warsh from Nafi, which is widely read in North Africa.  All have differences in the consonantal/diacritical marking (and vowel markings), but only one adds a consonant/word to the rasm: "then it is what" v. "it is what", where a "fa" consonant letter is added to the verse.

Ḥafs ʿan ʿĀṣim and Warš ʿan Nāfiʿ

While the change of voice or pronouns in these verse may seem confusing, it is very common in the Quran and found even in the same verse. (It is known as  iltifāt.)
Q.2:85 the "you" in Hafs refers to the actions of more than one person and the "They"  in Warsh is also referring to the actions of more than one person. 
Q.15:8  "We" refers to God in Hafs and the "They" in Warsh refers to what is not being sent down by God (The Angels). 
Q.19:19 (li-ʾahaba v. li-yahaba) is a well known difference, both for the theological interest in the alternative pronouns said to have been uttered by the angel, and for requiring unusual orthography. 
Q.48:17, the "He" in Hafs is referring to God and the "We" in Warsh is also referring to God, this is due to the fact that God refers to Himself in both the singular form and plural form by using the royal "We". 
Q.43:19 shows an example of a consonantal dotting difference that gives a different root word, in this case ʿibādu v. ʿinda.

The second set of examples below compares the other canonical readings with that of Ḥafs ʿan ʿĀṣim. These are not nearly as widely read today, though all are available in print and studied for recitation.

Other canonical readings

 Q.5:6 The variant grammatical cases (wa-arjulakum and wa-arjulikum) were adopted for different exegetical views by Sunni and Shīʿi scholars, such that in wudu the feet were either to be washed or rubbed, respectively. The reading of Abū ʿAmr was shared by Ibn Kaṯīr, Šuʿba ʿan ʿĀṣim and Ḥamza.
 Q.17:102 and Q20:96 are examples of verbal prefix or suffix variants (the latter also read by al-Kisāʾī).
 Q.19:25 has a notably large number of readings for this word (four canonical readings with different subject or verb form, and several non-canonical).
 Q.21:104 is an example of active-passive variants.
 Q.21.96 is an example of a verb form variant, with Ibn ʿĀmir reading the more intensive verb form II.
 Q59.14 is an example of singular-plural variants (also read by Abū ʿAmr).

Qira'at and Ahruf

Difference between them 

Although both Qira'at (recitations) and Ahruf (styles) refer to variants of the Quran, they are not the same. Ahmad 'Ali al Imam (and Ammar Khatib and Nazir Khan) notes three general explanations, described by Ibn al-Jazari, of what happened to the Ahruf. One group of scholars, exemplified by Ibn Hazm, held that Uthman preserved all seven ahruf. Another group, exemplified by Al-Tabari, held that Uthman preserved only one of the seven, unifying the ummah under it.  Finally, Ibn al-Jazari held what he said was the majority view, which is that the orthography of the Uthmanic copies accommodated a number of ahruf --  “some of the differences of the aḥruf, not all of them”.

Taking the second version of the history of the ahruf described above, Bilal Philips writes that Caliph 'Uthman eliminated six of the seven ahruf about half way through his reign, when confusion developed in the outlying provinces about the Quran's recitation. Some Arab tribes boasted about the superiority of their ahruf, and rivalries began; new Muslims also began combining the forms of recitation out of ignorance. Caliph 'Uthman decided to make official copies of the Quran according to the writing conventions of the Quraysh and send them with the Quranic reciters to the Islamic centres. His decision was approved by As-Sahaabah (the Companions of the Prophet), and all unofficial copies of the Quran were ordered destroyed; Uthman carried out the order, distributing official copies and destroying unofficial copies, so that the Quran began to be read in one harf, the same one in which it is written and recited throughout world today.

Philips writes that Qira'at is primarily a method of pronunciation used in recitations of the Quran. These methods are different from the seven forms, or modes (ahruf), in which the Quran was revealed. The methods have been traced back to Muhammad through a number of Sahaabah  who were noted for their Quranic recitations; they recited the Quran to Muhammad (or in his presence), and received his approval. These Sahaabah included: 
Ubayy ibn Ka'b
Ali Ibn Abi Talib 
Zayd ibn Thabit 
Abdullah ibn Masud 
Abu Darda
Abu Musa al-Ash'ari
Many of the other Sahaabah learned from them; master Quran commentator Ibn 'Abbaas learned from Ubayy and Zayd.

According to Philips, among the Successor (aka Tabi'in) generation of Muslims were many scholars who learned the methods of recitation from the Sahaabah and taught them to others. Centres of Quranic recitation developed in al-Madeenah, Makkah, Kufa, Basrah and Syria, leading to the development of Quranic recitation as a science. By the mid-eighth century CE, a large number of scholars were considered specialists in the field of recitation. Most of their methods were authenticated by chains of reliable narrators, going back to Muhammad. The methods which were supported by a large number of reliable narrators (i.e. readers or qāriʾūn) on each level of their chain were called mutawaatir, and were considered the most accurate. Methods in which the number of narrators were few (or only one) on any level of the chain were known as shaadhdh. Some scholars of the following period began the practice of designating a set number of individual scholars from the previous period as the most noteworthy and accurate. The number seven became popular by the mid-10th century, since it coincided with the number of dialects in which the Quran was revealed (a reference to Ahruf).

Another (more vague) differentiation between Qira'at (recitations) and Ahruf (styles) offered by Ammar Khatib and Nazir Khan is "...  the seven aḥruf are all the categories of variation to which the differences found within qirāʾāt correspond. In other words, they represent a menu of ingredients from which each qirāʾah selects its profile."

Scriptural basis for seven Ahruf

While different ahruf or variants of the Quran are not mentioned in the Quran, hadith do mention them. 
According to Bismika Allahuma, proof of the seven ahruf is found in many hadith, "so much so that it reaches the level of mutawaatir." One scholar,  Jalaal ad-Deen as-Suyootee, claims that twenty-one traditions of Companions of the Prophet state "that the Qur’aan was revealed in seven ahruf". One famous hadith (reported in the Muwatta of Malik ibn Anas) has "Umar Ibn al-Khattab manhandling Hisham Ibn Hakim Ibn Hizam after what he (Umar) thinks is an incorrect reading of the Quran by Hisham. When Umar hauls Hisham to the Prophet for chastisement," where Hisham and Umar each recite for Muhammad, Umar is surprised to hear the Prophet pronounce, "It was revealed thus", after each reading. Muhammad ends by saying: "It was revealed thus; this Quran has been revealed in seven Ahruf. You can read it in any of them you find easy from among them."

Disagreement
Javed Ahmad Ghamidi (and others) point out that Umar and Hisham belonged to the same tribe (the Quraysh), and members of the same tribe and would not have used different pronunciation. 
Supporters of the theory reply that Hisham may have been taught the Quran by a Companion of the Prophet from a different tribe. Nevertheless, Ghamidi questions the hadith which claim "variant readings", on the basis of Quranic verses, the Quran was compiled during Muhammad's lifetime and questions the hadith which report its compilation during Uthman's reign. Since most of these narrations are reported by Ibn Shihab al-Zuhri, Imam Layth Ibn Sa'd wrote to Imam Malik:
 

Abu 'Ubayd Qasim Ibn Sallam (died 224 AH) reportedly selected twenty-five readings in his book. The seven readings which are currently notable were selected by Abu Bakr Ibn Mujahid (died 324 AH, 936 CE) at the end of the third century from prominent reciters of his time, three from Kufa and one each from Mecca, Medina, and Basra and Damascus. It is generally accepted that although their number cannot be ascertained, every reading is Quran which has been reported through a chain of narration and is linguistically correct. Some readings are regarded as mutawatir, but their chains of narration indicate that they are ahad (isolate) and their narrators are suspect in the eyes of rijal authorities.

Questions and difficulties
According to scholars Ammar Khatib and Nazir Khan, "one aspect of the Qur’an" that after centuries of Islamic scholarship "continues to astound and puzzle researchers has been the fact that Qur’anic verses are recited in diverse ‘modes of recitation’ (qirāʾāt)". They call the issue of why the Qur’an has different recitations and where they came from, "burning questions".

In a 2020 interview, conservative Islamic scholar Abu Ammaar Yasir Qadhi stated that "every single student of knowledge ... who studies ulm of Quran" knows "that the most difficult topics are ahruf and qira’at", so vexing that even "the most advanced of our scholars, they are not quite fully certain how to solve all of it and answer questions in there",
and so sensitive that it "should never be brought up in public” and is "not something you discuss among the masses".  
Qadhi quotes a hadith where a ṣaḥābah of the Prophet (Ubayy ibn Ka'b) is reported to have said: “'in my heart a doubt came that I hadn’t had about Islam since the days of jahil'" and goes on to implore listeners, "this is not a joke brothers and sisters. The issue of Ahruf and Qiraat has caused confusion to somebody who the prophet said if you want to listen to the Quran directly listen to Ubay. …."

Developing view of full authenticity
Professor Shady Nasser of Harvard University is the author of books and papers on the canonization process of the Qur'an. Nasser has explored examples of prominent early scholars and grammarians who regarded some variants that were later considered canonical to be wrong (not just wrongly transmitted) or preferred some variants over others. In particular, he gives examples of such views from the time shortly before canonization expressed by Al-Tabari, the grammarian Al-Farraʼ, and Ibn Mujahid in the very work in which he selected the 7 readings (Kitab al-Sab’a fil-qirā’āt, particularly his "critical remarks [...] against Ibn ʿĀmir, Ḥamza, and some canonical Rāwīs such as Qunbul". In one summary he states in reference to certain critics and examples (elaborated in earlier chapters) that "The early Muslim community did not unconditionally accept all these Readings; the Readings of Ḥamza, al-Kisāʾī, and Ibn ʿĀmir were always disparaged, criticized, and sometimes ridiculed."

Contrasting with the view of early scholars that the readings included human interpretation and errors, Nasser writes, "This position changed drastically in the later periods, especially after the 5th/11th century where the canonical Readings started to be treated as divine revelation, i.e. every single variant reading in the seven and ten eponymous Readings was revealed by God to Muhammad."[unreliable source?]

Disagreement on mutawatir transmission from the Prophet

Doctrine holds that the readings that make up each of the canonical Qira'at can be traced by a chain of transmission (like hadith) back to the Prophet Muhammad, and even that they were transmitted by chains so numerous that their authenticity is beyond doubt (mutawatir). In theory, evidence of the canonical Qira'at should be found among the oldest Quranic manuscripts.

However, according to Morteza Karimi-Nia of the Encyclopaedia Islamica Foundation.
It must be noted that the seven variant readings attributed to the Seven Readers, which have been prevalent since the fourth/tenth century, are only rarely evident in the Qurʾānic manuscripts of the first two Islamic centuries. In these manuscripts, instead, one can find either the above-mentioned regional differences (as between Mecca, Medina, Kufa, Basra, or Damascus) or differences in lettering and dotting, which do not necessarily reflect the canonical variants of the Seven Readers but can be traced back to the readings of one of the Prophet’s Companions or Followers."

The view of some scholars that the differences, not just the agreement, between the canonical qira'at were transmitted mutawatir was a topic of disagreement among scholars. Shady Nasser notes that "all the Eponymous Readings were transmitted via single strands of transmissions (āḥād) between the Prophet and the seven Readers, which rendered the tawātur of these Readings questionable and problematic." He observes that qira'at manuals were often silent on the isnad (chain of transmission) between the eponymous reader and the Prophet, documenting instead the formal isnads from the manual author to the eponymous reader. Like Ibn Mujahid, often they separately included various biographical accounts connecting the reading back to the Prophet, while later manuals developed more sophisticated isnads. Nasser concludes that "the dominant and strongest opinion among the Muslim scholars holds to the non-tawātur of the canonical Readings". Marijn van Putten has noted similarly that "The view that the transmission of the Quran is tawātur seems to develop some significant time after the canonization of the readers".

Struggles of the Qurrāʾ
The writings of Ibn Mujahid give a great deal of insight into the community of the Qurrāʾ (Arabic: “reciters”). In his book on Ibn Mujahid's Kitab al-Sab’a, Shady Nasser cites specific examples to make many observations on the difficulties that the eponymous readers and their transmitters are therein reported to have experienced, while emphasising that they were "driven by sincere piety and admiration for the Qurʾānic revelation" and "went to extreme measures to preserve, perform and stabilize the text". For example, when precise information was missing on part of a reading, "the Qurrāʾ resorted to qiyās (analogy)", as did Ibn Mujahid himself in documenting the readings transmitted to him. In other cases, canonical transmitters such as Shu'ba said he "did not memorize" how his teacher 'Asim read certain words, or Ibn Mujahid had conflicting or missing information. Accounts report what Nasser describes as incidents of "ambivalence and indecisiveness" by readers themselves such as Abu 'Amr, 'Asim and Nafi., while Ibn Mujahid often lacked certain information on Ibn Amir's reading. Nasser also notes examples recorded by Ibn Mujahid of readers such as Abu 'Amr, al Kisa'i, Nafi, and the transmitters of 'Asim, Hafs and Shu'ba, in certain cases "retracting a reading and adopting a new one", or Shu'ba recounting that he "became skeptical" of his teacher 'Asim's reading of a certain word and adopted instead that of a non-canonical Kufan reader (al-A'mash). He notes the case of Ibn Dhakwan finding one reading for a word in his book/notebook, and recalling something different in his memory. Nasser observes that "when in doubt, the Qurrāʾ often referred to written records and personal copies of the Qurʾān", sometimes requesting to see the copy belonging to someone else.

In his book on Quranic Arabic and the reading traditions (open access in pdf format), Marijn van Putten puts forth a number of arguments such that the qira'at are not purely oral recitations, but also to an extent are readings dependent on the rasm, the ambiguities of which they interpreted in different ways, and that the readings accommodated the standardized rasm rather than the other way around.

Arabic dialect of the Qur'an
Contrary to popular conceptions, the Qur'an was not originally codified in Classical Arabic, instead originating in the Old Hijazi dialect of Arabic. Linguist and Quranic manuscript expert Dr. Marijn van Putten has written a number of papers on the Arabic evident in the Qur'anic consonantal text (QCT). Van Putten brings internal linguistic arguments (internal rhymes) to show that this dialect had lost the hamza (except at the end of words spoken in the canonical readings with a final alif), not just in the orthography of the written text, as is well established, but even in the original spoken performance of the Qur'an. He also notes Chaim Rabin's (d. 1996) observation of "several statements by medieval Arabic scholars that many important Hijazis, including the prophet, would not pronounce the hamza" and quotes his point that "the most celebrated feature of the Hijaz dialect is the disappearance of the hamza, or glottal stop". The canonical readings on the other hand use hamza much more widely and have considerable differences in its usage. In another paper, Van Putten and Professor Phillip Stokes argue, using various types of internal evidence and supported by early manuscripts and inscriptions of early dialects found in Arabia, that unlike the dialects found in the canonical readings, the spoken language behind the QCT "possessed a functional but reduced case system, in which cases marked by long vowels were retained, whereas those marked by short vowels were mostly lost".
 Van Putten also reconstructs the spoken dialect represented by the QCT to have treated nouns ending with feminine -at as diptotes (without nunation) rather than the triptotic feminine endings spoken in Qur'an recitations today.

A summary of these findings is given by Van Putten in his book, Quranic Arabic: From Its Hijazi Origins to Its Classical Reading Traditions . In the concluding chapter, van Putten reiterates his overall argument that the Quran has been "reworked and ‘Classicized’ over time, to yield the much more Classical looking forms of Arabic in which the text is recited today". He suggests that "we can see traces of the Classical Arabic case system having been imposed onto the original language as reflected in the QCT, which had lost most of its word final short vowels and tanwīn".

Van Putten has further argued that no canonical reading maintains any particular dialect. Rather, through a process of imperfect transmission and explicit choices, the readers assembled their own readings of the Quran, with no regard as to whether this amalgamation of linguistic features had ever occurred in a single dialect of the arabiyyah. In this way the readings came to have a mixed character of different dialectical features.

Recitation of scribal errors inherited from the original Uthmanic copies

In modern times some academic scholars have regarded descriptions by Muslim scholars of the 40 or so differences in the rasm (skeleton text) of the four copies of the Uthmanic codex sent out to Medina, Syria, and the garrison towns of Basra and Kufa, to be scribal errors in those copies, especially after Michael Cook (who expresses this view) established from these descriptions that they form a stemma (tree structure), widely considered to prove a written copying process. All subsequent manuscripts can be grouped into these regional families based on the inherited differences. Marijn Van Putten and Hythem Sidky have noted that the canonical readers strongly tended to include the differences found in the codex given to their region and adapted their readings accordingly, while Shady Nasser gives a somewhat more complex picture, with a more comprehensive list of the documented differences including those that are less well attested. He also identifies examples where different readers from the same town sometimes seem to have used codices from elsewhere. Hythem Sidky too notes some such examples, suggesting that as knowledge of regionally isolated variants proliferated, new options became available to the readers or that codices became contaminated through copying from multiple exemplars. He also finds that the less well attested variants in the rasm literature have a "poor agreement" with the regionality found in early manuscripts, whereas the well attested variants in the rasm literature (which form a stemma) have an "excellent agreement" with the manuscript evidence. He finds that "by all indications, documentation of the regional variants was an organic process", rather than being known at the time the codices were produced.

Implications of variant readings

Discussing different views on when the Quran reached a state of "codification" or stability Fred Donner argues that due to the variant readings which "circulated in great numbers" prior to the canonical selection, as well as the canonical differences, the Quran had not yet crystalized into a single, immutable codified form ... within one generation of Muhammad".

Donner does agree however, with the standard narrative that despite the presence of "some significant variants" in the qira'at literature,  there are not "long passages of otherwise wholly unknown text claiming to be Quran, or that appear to be used as Quran -- only variations within a text that is clearly recognizable as a version of a known Quranic passage". Revisionist historian Michael Cook also states that the Quran "as we know it",  is "remarkably uniform" in the rasm.
	
One example of how slight changes in lettering in different Qiraat suggesting the possibility of a major doctrinal impact on the Quran is the first word in two verses: Q.21:4 and 21:112. In Hafs qiraa version that first word is  "qāla,  translated as 'He (Muhammad, pbuh)  said ...'".  The orthography is different in the two verses—in Q.21:4 the second letter is a "plene" alif , in 21:112  "dagger aliph"  (i.e. a diacritical mark, so not part of the rasm as a plene aliph is). 
	
But in  Warsh qiraa the first word in the verses is a different verb form,  qul (the imperative 'say!') changing the verse from talking about what Muhammad said to a command from God.
	
Examining verse 21:112, Andrew Rippin states
	
"The very last verse (112) of sura 21 starts "He said [qāla], 'My Lord, judge according to the truth. Our Lord is the All-Merciful' ". The reference to "My Lord"  and "Our Lord" in the text indicates that the subject of  "He said " cannot be God but is the reciter of the Qur’än, in the first place understood to be Muhammad. Such a passage, in fact, falls into a common form of Qur’änic speech found in passages normally prefaced by the imperative "Say!" (qul).The significant point here is that in the text of the Qur’ān, the word here translated as "He said" is, in fact, more easily read as "Say!" due to the absence of the long "a" marker (something which commonly happens in the Qur’än, to be sure, but the word qäla is spelled this way only twice - the other occasion being in Qur’än 21:4 and that occurs in some of the traditions of the writing of the text). In the early Sana manuscripts, the absence of the long "a" in the word qäla is a marker of an entire set of early texts. But why should it be that this particular passage should be read in the way that it is? It really should read "Say!" to be parallel to the rest of the text. This opens the possibility that there was a time when the Qur’än was understood not as the word of God (as with "Say!") but the word of Muhammad as the speaking prophet. It would appear that in the process of editing the text, most passages were transformed from "He said" to "Say!" in both interpretation and writing with the exception of these two passages in Sura 21 which were not changed. This could have occurred only because somebody was working on the basis of the written text in the absence of a parallel oral tradition".[unreliable source?] i.e. the verses in the Hafs version may have been an editing oversight where in the process of converting the Quran from  "the word of Muhammad as the speaking prophet" to "the word of God",  dozens of 'Say!' [qul], were added or replaced "He said [qāla]", but a couple of qāäla were missed.

Misunderstanding

Using "qiraʼat"/"recitations" to describe Quranic variants may sound as though different reciters are reading from the same text (or reciting based on the same text) but with different "prolongation, intonation, and pronunciation of words";  or if their spoken words are different it's because they have the same consonants but  different vowel markings (see orthography diagram above).  (Ammar Khatib and Nazir Khan, for example, talk of the "basis of the qirāʾāt" being "words that can be read in multiple ways" rather than different  words or word forms used in the same verse.)
However, not only do the written vowel markings and written consonant diacritical marks differ between Qiraʼat, there are also occasional small but "substantial" differences in the "skeleton" of the script (rasm, see  Examples of differences between readings) that Uthman reportedly standardized.

Rationale
According to Oliver Leaman, "the origin" of the differences of qira'at "lies in the fact that the linguistic system of the Quran incorporates the most familiar Arabic dialects and vernacular forms in use at the time of the Revelation."  According to Csaba Okváth, "Different recitations [different qira'at] take into account dialectal features of Arabic language ..."

Similarly, the Oxford Islamic Studies Online writes that "according to classical Muslim sources", the variations that crept up before Uthman created the "official" Quran "dealt with subtleties of pronunciations and accents (qirāʿāt) and not with the text itself which was transmitted and preserved in a culture with a strong oral tradition."

On the other hand, Aisha Abdurrahman Bewley  writes that different qirāʿāt have "different diacritical marks”, and the differences "compliment other recitations and add to the meaning, and are a source of exegesis."  Ammar Khatib and Nazir Khan contend that qirāʿāt "constitute a unique feature of the Qur’an that multiplies its eloquence and aesthetic beauty", and "in certain cases" the  differences in qirāʾāt "add nuances in meaning, complementing one another."

Questions

Other reports of what the Prophet said (as well as some scholarly commentary) seem to contradict the presence of variant readings -- ahruf or qirāʾāt.

Abu Abd Al-Rahman al-Sulami writes, "The reading of Abu Bakr, Umar, Uthman and Zayd ibn Thabit and that of all the Muhajirun and the Ansar was the same. They would read the Quran according to the Qira'at al-'ammah. This is the same reading which was read out twice by the Prophet to Gabriel in the year of his death. Zayd ibn Thabit was also present in this reading [called] the Ardah-i akhirah. It was this very reading that he taught the Quran to people till his death". According to Ibn Sirin, "The reading on which the Quran was read out to the prophet in the year of his death is the same according to which people are reading the Quran today".

Examining the hadith of Umar's surprise in finding out "this Quran has been revealed in seven Ahruf", Suyuti, a noted 15th-century Islamic theologian, concludes the "best opinion" of this hadith is that it is "mutashabihat", i.e. its meaning "cannot be understood."

See also

References

Habib Hassan Touma (1996). The Music of the Arabs, trans. Laurie Schwartz. Portland, Oregon: Amadeus Press. .

Notes

Citations

Sources
Qiraa'aat Warch & Hafs
Islamic-Awareness.org
The seven Qira'at
‘Alawi Ibn Muhammad Ibn Ahmad Bilfaqih, Al-Qirâ'ât al-cashr al-Mutawâtir, 1994, Dâr al-Muhâjir
Adrian Brockett, "The Value of Hafs And Warsh Transmissions For The Textual History Of The Qur'an" in Andrew Rippin's (Ed.), Approaches of The History of Interpretation of The Qur'an, 1988, Clarendon Press, Oxford, p. 33.

 
 
The Origins of the Variant Readings of the Qur’an, Yaqeen Institute

External links
Readings of the Quran, including a biography of The Seven Readers, Quran Archive.
Online Quran Project Community Site.
Frequent Questions around qiraat about: the different Qiraat, including REFUTING The Claim of Differences in Quran and other useful information 
 quran.com - By clicking Settings and selecting the Bridges’ translation by Fadel Soliman, words that have significant variants among the ten canonical qira'at are highlighted in red, together with a footnote listing the readers or transmitters and an English translation for each of the variant readings
erquran.org - Encyclopedia of the Readings of the Quran (with tutorial videos). A database and tools for studying canonical and non-canonical reading variants.
 nquran.com - Compare variant readings in Arabic among the ten readers in each of their two canonical transmissions
 corpuscoranicum.de - Compare transliterated variant readings (including some non-canonical), with the main 7 canonical readings as recorded by Abū ʿAmr ad-Dānī highlighted in dark green (scroll right to see columns)